Krishen Khanna (born 5 July 1925) is an Indian artist. He attended Imperial Service College in England and is a self-taught artist. He is recipient of the Rockefeller Fellowship in 1962, the Padma Shri in 1990, and the Padma Bhushan in 2011.

Early life
Khanna was born on 5 July 1925 in Lyallpur (now Faisalabad, Pakistan). In 1938 Khanna travelled from Bombay to Britain on RMS Strathmore. After attending the Imperial Service College from 1938 to 1942, Khanna enrolled at Government College, Lahore, from 1942 to 1944. In 1946 he started working with Grindlays Bank for 14 years. In 1961 he resigned from the bank and devoted his full-time to art.

A Far Afternoon: a painted saga by Krishen Khanna (2015) 
A Far Afternoon — A painted saga by Krishen Khanna is a feature documentary directed by Sruti Harihara Subramanian and produced by Piramal Art Foundation. It is devoted to tracing the journey of Krishan Khanna as an artist, and delineates his career in an interesting manner.

The documentary is a filmmaker's attempt to memorialize the artistic process involved in the creation of the eponymous art work by veteran artist Krishen Khanna, and trace some of the influences upon the artist. A film in five parts, A Far Afternoon, delves into those influences that eventually rendered themselves on canvas. There is the vibrant city of Bombay, where Krishen Khanna found a home after the partition of India cut him away from his native land; there is in particular the strongly leftist Progressive Artists Group which flourished in the city for half a century following independence, and into which he was inducted; there is the baaraat (wedding procession), typical of Indian weddings, which is a recurring presence in his works; there is his choice of colours, predominated by many shades of yellow, blue and white; there is the influence of other artists and other art works that have brought him to this place and point in time. The music directors of A Far Afternoon the music duo Aravind-Jai Shankar are based out of Chennai, India. They have worked on national award-winning films, documentaries, advertising commercials, computer and mobile device games and numerous other projects encompassing the scope of music, sound design, and audio production. 

The documentary received two National awards for Best Art / Cultural Film and the National Award for Best Music (Non-Feature). It also received other accolades:
 63rd National Film Awards — Best Art/Cultural film
 63rd National Film Awards — Best music (non-feature film category)
 New York Indian Film Festival — Nominated for Best Documentary — May 2016
 3rd Cinema Indien, Stockholm — Official selection — April2016
 All Lights India International Film Festival — Official Selection — November 2015

Awards, fellowships and honors
 Rockefellar Fellowship (1962)
 National Award Lalit Kala Academi (1965)
 Fellowship of the Council of Economics and Cultural Affairs, New York (1965)
 Gold Medal First Triennale of Contemporary World Art, New Delhi (1968)
 President's Award, International Festival of Art, Baghdad, Iraq (1986)
 Gold Medal First Biennale Of Art, Lahore, Pakistan (1986)
 Padma Shri by Gov't of India (1990)
 Padma Bhushan by Gov't of India (2011)

References

External links
Talk about art and life with The Wire on YouTube
Slide lecture on mural created at ITC Maurya, New Delhi on YouTube
Conversation with Kiran Nadar Museum of Art on 96th birthday on YouTube
Five part documentary on Internet Archive: Vol. I, Vol. II, Vol. III, Vol. IV and Vol. V (in Hindi)

Artists from Lahore
1925 births
Living people
Rockefeller Fellows
Recipients of the Padma Shri in arts
Recipients of the Padma Bhushan in arts

Self-taught artists
Indian male painters
20th-century Indian male artists
21st-century Indian male artists